Anderson-Shiro High School is a public secondary school located in Anderson, Texas, United States and classified as a 3A school by the UIL.  It is part of the Anderson-Shiro Consolidated Independent School District located in Grimes County, Texas. In 2017, the school was rated "Met Standard" by the Texas Education Agency.

Athletics
Anderson-Shiro High School participates in these sports - 

Cross Country, Football, Volleyball, Basketball, Golf, Track, Tennis, Baseball & Softball

State Titles 
Baseball - 
2006(1A)

State Finalist
Boys Basketball - 
1996(1A)

Other school activities

Anderson-Shiro also has a Theatre class that performs during the spring semester, competes in UIL One-Act Play, and has an Art, choir, a Band program, FFA, and FBLA.

The Choir program is exclusively Jr High currently, but there are plans to extend it to high school in the coming years.

The High school band program competes in UIL marching and Concert/Sight Reading competitions, with the most recent scores being 3 for Marching Band (2019-2020 school year) and 2 for Concert (2020-2021), and a 2 for Sight Reading (2020-2021). The Band also has individuals audition for the ATSSB All-State band, although it has not had a student to make it past All-Area (as of the 2018–2019 school year). The program currently (for the 2021–2022 school year) has 3 bands: Beginning Band; a band for 6th/7th graders who are new to their instruments; Symphonic Band; a band for 7th/8th graders; and Wind Ensemble; The High school band that has members from 8th grade to 12th grade (as of the 2018–2019 school year) which compete in the UIL and ATSSB events mentioned above. The Band Director is also looking to start a Jazz Band in the near future. 

The schools FFA chapter is very successful with having many people advance to state every year.

A chapter of FBLA was established during the 2018–2019 school year, but has had people advance to state in individual competition. The chapter also regularly volunteers for the local food pantry.

References

External links
Anderson-Shiro Consolidated Independent School District

Schools in Grimes County, Texas
Public high schools in Texas